Behind the News is a children's news programme broadcast on ABC TV in Australia.

Behind the News may also refer to:

 Behind the News (film), a 1940 American drama film
 Behind the News, a radio program hosted by Doug Henwood from 1996 to 2010